Carol Tulloch is a British author and academic who is a Professor of Dress, Diaspora and Transnationalism at the University of the Arts London, known for her work on cultural heritage, auto/biography, personal archives and style narratives.

Biography
Tulloch was born to Jamaican parents in Doncaster, South Yorkshire. She studied Fashion and Textile Design at Ravensbourne, and History of Design at the Royal College of Art/V&A. Her curatorial work on black style has resulted in exhibitions at the V&A, articles in academic and popular press, and books that explore style narratives of the African diaspora.

Bibliography 
 "There's No Place Like Home: Home Dressmaking and Creativity in the Jamaican Community in the 1940s to 1960s", in: The Culture of Sewing: Gender, Consumption and Home Dressmaking, London: Berg, 1999
 Fashion and Photography (ed.), special edition of Fashion Theory, 2002
 Entry on "Dress", in: The Encyclopaedia of Race and Ethnic Studies, London; New York: Routledge, 2003
 Black Style V&A, 2004
 "Picture This: The Black Curator", in: The Politics of Heritage: Legacies of Race, London; New York : Routledge, 2005
 "James Van Der Zee: Couple in Raccoon Coats", in: The Folio Society Book of the 100 Greatest Photographs, London: The Folio Society, 2006
 The Birth of Cool: Style Narratives of the African Diaspora, Bloomsbury Academic, 2016
 The Persistence of Taste: Art, Museums and Everyday Life After Bourdieu, Routledge, 2018
 If I Don't do Some Couching I Will Burst, European Journal Of Cultural Studies, 2022

Exhibitions 
 Black British Style, V&A, 2004–2005
 The March of the Women: Suffragettes and the State, The National Archives, London, 2003
 Picture This: Representations of Black People in Product Promotion, Archives and Museum of Black Heritage Project, 2002
 Grow Up!: Advice and the Teenage Girl, The Women's Library, London, 2002-3
 Nails, Weaves and Naturals: Hairstyles and Nail Art of the African Diaspora, A Day of Record, Archives and Museum of Black Heritage Project, 2001
 Jessica Ogden: Still, Church Street, London, 2017

References

Black British women academics
Year of birth missing (living people)
Living people
Academics of the University of the Arts London
People from Doncaster
Alumni of the Royal College of Art
British women curators